To Whom It May Concern is the second and final studio album of the American rock band Splender.

Track listing

External links 

 "To Whom It May Concern" by Splender at MusicBrainz

2002 albums
Splender albums
J Records albums
Albums produced by Mark Endert